Jodi Grace Barnes (born March 9, 1971) is a Canadian former pairs skater competing for  Canadian Nationals for almost a decade. 1980's Canadian medalists included Jodi Barns and Rob Williams who competed for Canada. With former partner Rob Williams, she made her international debut at the 1987 Junior World ranking 7th in the World. Studied Business at Douglas College in Vancouver. In 1997 Barnes and Williams were selected to represent Canada in the 1997 in Jaca Spain for the World Professional Figure Skating Championships. After Barnes and Williams competitive career they went on tour as principal pairs. Barnes and Williams starred in Holiday on Ice, Feld Entertainment (1996 Disney's World On Ice - Toy Story.) Willy Bietak Productions the leaders in the Ice Show Industry. After William retired Barnes continued pairs skating as a performance director for major ice productions as well as choreographing for international skaters Scarlett Rouzet & Yannick Bonheur and major ice productions. Barnes began her coaching career on the West Coast of the United States in 2008. Barnes is currently coaching at Panthers Figure Skating Club, Panthers Ice Den in Coral Springs, Florida.

Personal life
Jodi Grace Banes was born on March 9, 1971, in Vancouver, Canada she is the daughter of Janet Banes and William Barnes. Barnes has two sisters Wendi Harvey and Cindi Nawyn. Barnes was raised in Pitt Meadows, British Columbia.  She attended Sentinel Secondary School in West Vancouver. Barnes went on to study business at Douglas College. Barnes is married to Alexander "Sasha" Klimkin Soviet Union born, former Junior National Champion. They coach at the Panthers Figure Skating Club, Panthers Ice Den in Coral Springs, Florida. They have identical twin boys Pavel and Ilya Klimkin born December 13, 2008.

Coaching career
Former students include: Samantha Marchant and Chad Hawse, Meirlya Findley, Madalyn Moree.

In 2017 Barnes received from U.S.Figure Skating her Sectionals Pairs Technical Specialist Appointment

Results
(with Williams)

Competitive highlights

References

1971 births
Living people
World Junior Figure Skating Championships medalists
Canadian female pair skaters
Figure skating coaches
People from Pitt Meadows
Sportspeople from British Columbia